Peña, meaning "rocky outcrop" or "rocky summit" in the Spanish language (Aragonese: Penya, Catalan: Penya). It may refer to:

Mountains
Peña Montañesa, a mountain in the Pre-Pyrenees, Aragon, Spain
Peña de los Enamorados, a mountain near Antequera, Andalusia, Spain
Peña de Bernal, a mountain in Querétaro, Mexico
Peña Prieta, a mountain in the Cantabrian Mountains, highest point of the range outside the Picos de Europa
Peña Cebollera, a mountain in the Sistema Ibérico, one of the four highest peaks of the system
Peña de las Once, a mountain in the Pyrenees, Sobrarbe, Aragon; see List of mountains in Aragon
Peña del Mediodía, a mountain in the Pyrenees, Sobrarbe, Aragon; see List of mountains in Aragon
Peña Forca, a mountain in the Pyrenees, Jacetania, Aragon; see List of mountains in Aragon
Peña Gratal, a mountain in the Pre-Pyrenees, Hoya de Huesca, Aragon; see List of mountains in Aragon
Peña Falconera, a point near Morrano, Aragon, Spain
Peña Mira, the highest point in the Sierra de la Culebra range, Castile & León
Peña Nobla, a mountain in the Pyrenees, Jacetania/Cinco Villas, Aragon; see List of mountains in Aragon
Peña Oroel, a mountain in the Pyrenees, Jacetania, Aragon; see List of mountains in Aragon
Peña Solana, a mountain in the Pyrenees, Sobrarbe, Aragon; see List of mountains in Aragon
Peña Foratata, a mountain in the Pyrenees, Alto Gállego, Aragon
Peña Telera, a mountain in the Pyrenees, Alto Gállego, Aragon
Peña de Herrera, a mountain in the Moncayo Massif, Campo de Borja, Aragon; see List of mountains in Aragon
Peña Trevinca, a mountain in Galicia, Spain
Penyagolosa, a mountain in the Sistema Ibérico, Valencian Community, Spain
Penyagalera, a mountain in the Sistema Ibérico, Aragon, Spain

People
 Peña (surname)
 List of people with surname Peña
 de la Peña

Places
 Cayo Luis Peña, an island and municipality of Puerto Rico
 Peña Municipality, a municipality in Yaracuy, Venezuela
 Peñarrubia, Abra, a municipality of the Philippines
 Tamboril, Dominican Republic, formerly Peña

Sports
Peña Sport FC
Penya Encarnada d'Andorra
Penya Rhin Grand Prix

Other uses
Peña (music), a meeting place or grouping of musicians or artists

See also 
La Peña (disambiguation)
Pena (disambiguation)
Penha (disambiguation)
Peñón, a type of Spanish rocky island fort
Pina (disambiguation)
Piña (disambiguation)
Peña Blanca (disambiguation)